Karin Olsson (born November 23, 1961) is a Swedish sprint canoer who competed in the early 1980s. She won two bronze medals at the ICF Canoe Sprint World Championships with one in the K-2 500 m (1982) and one in the K-4 500 m (1981).

Olsson also finished fifth in the K-2 500 m event at the 1980 Summer Olympics in Moscow.

References

Sports-reference.com profile

1961 births
Canoeists at the 1980 Summer Olympics
Living people
Olympic canoeists of Sweden
Swedish female canoeists
ICF Canoe Sprint World Championships medalists in kayak